The Stratiotici were a gnostic sect, a subgroup of the Borborites. Little else is known about them besides what the Church Fathers wrote on them.

Description
The sect were a sub-group of the Borborians, of which the Coddians, Stratiotici and the Phibiomites had together a family connection to Gnostics. The name deriving from stratos  which in the Greek language meant army,   or soldierly ( soldiers of (Walker 1983) )   as a translation from the Latin. The  names attributed to sects were possibly only those given by their enemies. Little is known of the sect as rituals were practised in secrecy, scriptures were  unwritten by the practitioners, resulting on the necessary reliance of accounts of their practice  in the writings of the holy church fathers.

Insight
The sect and other self defining gnostics were the subject of criticism by the Church Fathers, these finding evidence of heresy and blasphemy caused by a corruption of the truth of Christian doctrine. This the fathers may have attributed to the former weight of their ancestral sin or the result of persons with unclean spirits.

References 

Gnosticism